Events from the year 1880 in France.

Incumbents
President: Jules Grévy
President of the Council of Ministers:  Charles de Freycinet (until 23 September), Jules Ferry (starting 23 September)

Events
 29 June – France annexes Tahiti.
 Musée Carnavalet is opened to the public as a museum of Paris history.
 Discovery of piezoelectricity by Pierre Curie and Jacques Curie.

Births
 14 January – Pierre-Marie Gerlier, Cardinal (died 1965)
 5 February – Gabriel Voisin, aviation pioneer (died 1973)
 20 February – Jacques d'Adelswärd-Fersen, aristocrat, novelist and poet (died 1923)
 21 February – Pierre Chaumié, politician (died 1966)
 17 April – Jacques Suzanne, painter, artist and explorer (died 1967)
 25 May – Jean Alexandre Barré, neurologist (died 1967)
 26 August – Guillaume Apollinaire, poet, writer and art critic (died 1918)
 12 October – Marcel-Bruno Gensoul, admiral (d. 1973)
 8 December – Clément-Emile Roques, Cardinal (died 1964)

Full date unknown
 Charles Catteau, industrial designer (died 1966)
 Désiré-Émile Inghelbrecht, composer and conductor (died 1965)

Deaths
 4 January – Marthe Camille Bachasson, Count of Montalivet, statesman and Peer of France (born 1801)
 17 January – Agenor, duc de Gramont, diplomat and statesman (born 1819)
 31 January – Adolphe Granier de Cassagnac, journalist and politician (born 1806)
 8 May – Gustave Flaubert, novelist (born 1821)
 24 June – Jules Antoine Lissajous, mathematician (born 1822)
 9 July – Paul Broca, physician, anatomist, and anthropologist (born 1824)
 5 October - Jacques Offenbach, German composer (born 1819)
 22 October - Alphonse Pénaud, aeronautical pioneer (born 1850)
 10 November – Sabin Berthelot, naturalist and ethnologist (born 1794)
 20 November – Léon Cogniet, painter (born 1794)
 24 November – Napoléon Henri Reber, composer (born 1807)

References

1880s in France